Chinese Courier was an English-language newspaper in Canton, China, in the 19th century. It was printed every week.

References

Defunct newspapers published in China
Defunct weekly newspapers
Mass media in Guangzhou
English-language newspapers published in China
Publications with year of establishment missing